High Tower was the 2014 edition of Sveriges Radio's Christmas Calendar.

Plot
John, Samira and Anja are all 10 years old, and live inside the "High Tower" highrise building in the locality of "Mårsta". Construction of the building was led by a rich man called Bengt Golnander. Since then, it has decayed and the families have to move out after Christmas. But the children want to continue live there, and start looking for Bengt Golnander.

References
 

2014 radio programme debuts
2014 radio programme endings
Fictional houses
Sveriges Radio's Christmas Calendar